The inauguration of Filipe Nyusi as the fourth President of Mozambique took place on Thursday, 15 January 2015. The inauguration marked the beginning of the first term of Filipe Nyusi as President.

Attendance

Dignitaries

Former leaders

References

External links
 Images of the ceremony on Facebook
 
 

Presidential inaugurations